The 2021 Hamburg European Open was a combined men's and women's tennis tournament played on outdoor clay courts. It was the 115th edition of the event for the men and the 19th edition for the women, after last tournament being held in 2002. The tournament was classified as a WTA 250 tournament on the 2021 WTA Tour and as an ATP Tour 500 series on the 2021 ATP Tour. The tournament took place at the Am Rothenbaum in Hamburg, Germany between 6 and 18 July 2021.

Champions

Men's singles

 Pablo Carreño Busta def.  Filip Krajinović, 6–2, 6–4

Women's singles

  Elena-Gabriela Ruse def.  Andrea Petkovic, 7–6(8–6), 6–4

This was Ruse's maiden WTA Tour singles title.

Men's doubles

 Tim Pütz /  Michael Venus def.  Kevin Krawietz /  Horia Tecău 6–3, 6–7(3–7), [10–8].

Women's doubles

 Jasmine Paolini /  Jil Teichmann def.  Astra Sharma /  Rosalie van der Hoek 6–0, 6–4

Points and prize money

Points distribution

Prize money 

*per team

ATP singles main draw entrants

Seeds

 1 Rankings are as of 28 June 2021.

Other entrants
The following players received wildcards into the main draw:
  Daniel Altmaier
  Philipp Kohlschreiber
  Nicola Kuhn
  Stefanos Tsitsipas

The following players received entry from the qualifying draw:
  Maximilian Marterer
  Alex Molčan
  Thiago Seyboth Wild
  Carlos Taberner
  Juan Pablo Varillas
  Zhang Zhizhen

The following players received entry as lucky losers:
  Sebastián Báez
  Sumit Nagal

Withdrawals
Before the tournament
  Pablo Andújar → replaced by  Sumit Nagal
  Félix Auger-Aliassime → replaced by  Lucas Pouille
  Aljaž Bedene → replaced by  Sebastián Báez
  Márton Fucsovics → replaced by  Gianluca Mager
  Aslan Karatsev → replaced by  Corentin Moutet
  Lorenzo Sonego → replaced by  Ričardas Berankis

ATP doubles main draw entrants

Seeds

1 Rankings are as of 28 June 2021.

Other entrants
The following pairs received wildcards into the doubles main draw:
  Daniel Altmaier /  Rudolf Molleker
  Petros Tsitsipas /  Stefanos Tsitsipas

The following pair received entry using protected ranking:
  Ričardas Berankis /  Lu Yen-hsun

The following pair received entry from the qualifying draw:
  Alessandro Giannessi /  Carlos Taberner

The following pair received entry as lucky losers:
  Ruben Gonzales /  Hunter Johnson

Withdrawals
Before the tournament
  Luke Bambridge /  Dominic Inglot → replaced by  Ruben Gonzales /  Hunter Johnson
  Simone Bolelli /  Máximo González → replaced by  Ivan Sabanov /  Matej Sabanov
  Sander Gillé /  Joran Vliegen → replaced by  Sander Gillé /  Divij Sharan
  Marcel Granollers /  Horacio Zeballos → replaced by  James Cerretani /  Hans Hach Verdugo
  Oliver Marach /  Philipp Oswald → replaced by  N.Sriram Balaji /  Luca Margaroli
During the tournament
  Filip Krajinović /  Dušan Lajović

WTA singles main draw entrants

Seeds

 1 Rankings are as of 28 June 2021.

Other entrants
The following players received wildcards into the main draw:
  Mona Barthel
  Tamara Korpatsch
  Jule Niemeier

The following players received entry from the qualifying draw:
  Marina Melnikova
  Mandy Minella
  Elena-Gabriela Ruse
  Anna Zaja

The following player received entry as a lucky loser:
  Kristína Kučová

Withdrawals
Before the tournament
  Paula Badosa → replaced by  Kristýna Plíšková
  Sorana Cîrstea → replaced by  Irina Bara
  Alizé Cornet → replaced by  Kristína Kučová
  Varvara Gracheva → replaced by  Andrea Petkovic
  Tereza Martincová → replaced by  Ana Konjuh
  Laura Siegemund → replaced by  Ysaline Bonaventure
  Sara Sorribes Tormo → replaced by  Astra Sharma
  Patricia Maria Țig → replaced by  Magdalena Fręch
  Zhang Shuai → replaced by  Anna-Lena Friedsam

WTA doubles main draw entrants

Seeds

1 Rankings are as of 28 June 2021.

Other entrants
The following pair received a wildcard into the doubles main draw:
  Eva Lys /  Noma Noha Akugue

References

External links
 Official website

 
2021 in German tennis
Hamburg European Open
Hamburg European Open
2021
July 2021 sports events in Germany
2020s in Hamburg